Henri Joseph Du Laurens (sometimes Laurens or Dulaurens, original name Henri Joseph Laurent, 1719–1793 or 1797) was a French unfrocked trinitarian monk, satirical poet and novelist, born at Douai, the son of the regimental surgeon Jean Joseph Laurent and his wife Marie Josephe Menon. He was author of such libertine works as Le compère Matthieu, Imirce, ou la fille de la nature and L'Arrétin moderne. He may also have written Candide, Part II. He died at Mariembourg in the French First Republic, now in Belgium.

External links

Du Laur (in French)

References

1719 births
1797 deaths
People from Douai
18th-century French novelists
French male novelists
Trinitarians
18th-century French male writers